Because I Love You may refer to:

Films 
 Because I Love You (1928 film)
 Because I Love You (2017 film)

Music
 "Because I Love You" (1965), a song by Billy Stewart
 "Because I Love You" (1967), a song by Georgie Fame
 "Because I Love You" (1970), a song by The Five Stairsteps
 "Because I Love You" (1970), a song by The Masters Apprentices
 "Because I Love You" (Badfinger song) (1981)
 "Because I Love You" (1986), a song by Shakin' Stevens
 Because I Love You (album), a 1987 album by Yoo Jae-ha
 "Because I Love You (The Postman Song)" (1990), a song by Stevie B
 "Because I Love You" (September song) (2008)
 "Because I Love You" (Montaigne song) (2016)

See also
 Coz I Luv You, a song by Slade from their album of the same name